Disney Channel is an American pay television channel operated by Disney Branded Television, a division of The Walt Disney Company. Over the years the company has delved into TV units. 
 Disney Media Networks, the former division before October 2020 restructured into Disney Media and Entertainment Distribution, Disney General Entertainment Content, and ESPN and Sports Content
 Walt Disney Television
 Disney Junior (formerly Playhouse Disney)
 Disney XD (proceeded by Toon Disney)
 Radio Disney, a Disney radio station in the United States
 Walt Disney Television (production), a United States-based TV production company
 Disney Television Animation, a TV studio dedicated to animation sometimes credited as Disney Channel Animation

See also 

 Disney Channel Original Movies (DCOM)

Disney Channel